Bellamkonda is an Indian name. Notable people with the name include:

Bellamkonda Sreenivas (born 1993), Indian film actor and model
Bellamkonda Suresh, Indian film producer 
Ravi V. Bellamkonda (born 1968), Indian biomedical engineer

Indian masculine given names